Fenix Football Club Sydney, is an Australian association football club located in Fairfield, New South Wales.
The club was founded on 15 August 2004, currently a member of the Sydney Amateur Football League under the Football NSW federation. The club is largely supported by members of the Latin American Australian community.

History 
Inaugurated on 15 August 2004, by Chilean Luis Gutiérrez, and the Uruguayan Fabian Mateo, the early days of Fenix were mostly arranged by the two characters mentioned above. The name of the club was adopted by the founders who were searching for a name with the characteristics of being a Uruguayan club, but not of extreme fame like Peñarol or Nacional, and in honour to Centro Atlético Fenix, an Uruguayan institution founded in July 1916, the name was adopted and the club baptised as Fenix. The name Fenix (Phoenix in English) refers to the mythological immortal bird, that lights itself on fire when its death is near, and reincarnates from its own ashes; the fenix is the emblem and logo of the club.

In 2010, Luis Gutierrez, the only founder who was still participating with the club, decided to leave and presented his resignation to the Public Officer role that he had been in charge since the foundation of the club, due to personal reasons.

Uniform 
Throughout time the club has owned a series of uniforms, when first established the uniform was a white shirt, with light blue details, and a Flag of Uruguay on the left arm, an upgrade was made the following years and a light blue uniform, similar to the one used by the Uruguay national football team was used.

As time progressed, the Uruguayan identity has expanded to a South American one and the white and purple uniform was introduced to represent a team rather than a nation, and until now the club has kept the same colours, as seasons have gone past the details on the uniform have changed, the first jersey did not have sponsors and the numbers were black, a second set was introduced with minor variations. 
In 2009 a new design was added and it was first presented to an official match on 17 May 2009, traditionally the club uses a jersey half white and half purple, black shorts and purple socks. The away uniform is a white shirt with yellow and grey details, with black shorts and white socks.

Committee

Board of Directors 2010  

President: Ivan Caru.
General Secretary: Gonzalo Hamdan.
Administrator: Rodrigo Gutierrez.
Canteen Coordinator: Rony Aguayo.
Equipment Manager: Carlos Martinez.

Honours 

 Patricia Bobadilla Cup:
 2004 Champions
 2005 Runners Up
 2006 Runners Up
 2007 Third Place
 2008 Champions
 Cacique Cup:
 2007 Fourth Place
 2008 Third Place
 2009 Runners Up
 Copa Libertadores Sydney:
 2009 Third Place
 S.D.S.F.A. League:
 2005 Champions
 S.A.F.L League Second Division:
 2006 Third Place
 2007 Runners Up
 2008 Runners Up
 S.A.F.L League:
 2009 Third Place

Current squad

References

External links
Official site

Soccer clubs in Sydney
Association football clubs established in 2004
2004 establishments in Australia